Archibald Adair  (died 1647) was a 17th-century Irish Anglican bishop.

Adair was Dean of Raphoe from 1622 to 1630, when he became Bishop of Killala and Achonry. He was nominated on 23 November 1629 and consecrated 9 May the following year.  Deprived on 18 May 1640 (subsequently set aside), he was translated to Waterford and Lismore on 13 July 1641. He died in 1647.

References

Deans of Raphoe
Bishops of Killala and Achonry
Bishops of Waterford and Lismore (Church of Ireland)
1647 deaths
Year of birth unknown